The Corbet Field is a multi-use stadium in St Sampson, Guernsey.  It is currently used for football matches and Crown Green Bowling. The field is the home of Vale Recreation FC, Vale Recreation Bowls Club and serves as the home of the Guernsey national football team administration centre.

History

The stadium was built in 1932 by Jurat Wilfred John Corbet OBE (1893–1971) who donated the land for such use.

References

Football venues in Guernsey
Vale Recreation F.C.
1932 establishments in Guernsey
Multi-purpose stadiums
Sports venues in Guernsey